Willem van Kooten (born 7 January 1941 in Hilversum) is a Dutch entrepreneur and former DJ under the name Joost den Draaijer . His son Eelko van Kooten is the founder of the Warner Music Group division Spinnin' Records.

See also
 Van (Dutch)

References

1941 births
Dutch DJs
People from Hilversum
Dutch businesspeople
Living people